"You" is a song by American record producer Benny Blanco, with American DJ Marshmello and Australian singer Vance Joy. It was released through Interscope Records, Friends Keep Secrets and Joytime Collective on January 29, 2021. It was co-written by Blake Slatkin and Caroline Pennell. The song was included on the reissue of Blanco's debut studio album Friends Keep Secrets, released on 2021.

At the APRA Music Awards of 2022, the song was nominated for Most Performed Pop Work.

Background
The song was announced on January 22. In a statement Blanco said that he has been friends with Vance Joy and Marshmello for a long time and that it was the right time to do something together. Marshmello added that "Benny showed me this demo in his studio one day" and "I was instantly drawn to the song and knew I had to try something a little different with it. I sent my initial idea to Benny and from there we went back and forth until we created what everyone can hear right now".

Critical reception
"You" received positive criticism from music critics. Alexander Costello of We Rave You opined that the song "is a refreshing track that embodies soft melodies and a charming character [...]. With Joy's vocals [...], the track discharges a delightful mid-section and chorus that gets better and better with every listen". uDiscoverMusic critic Sam Armstrong described that "this collaboration brings out the best in each artist, fusing Blanco's easy popcraft, Marshmello's slick production, and Joy's buoyant vocals".

Music video
The video, directed by William Child, shows an animation made of clay of the three artists at a picnic until Marshmello and Vance Joy are kidnapped by a green monster. Blanco tracks them down, but when he confronts the kidnapper, he hugs the monster instead, and they all end up hanging out together and enjoying joints in the hot tub and playing some pool, and then say goodbye to him.

Credits and personnel
Credits adapted from Tidal.

 Vance Joy – lead vocals, songwriter
 Benny Blanco – producer, songwriter, keyboard, programming, recording engineer
 Marshmello – producer, songwriter, keyboard, programming
 Blake Slatkin – songwriter, guitar, keyboard, programming, recording engineer
 Caroline Pennell – songwriter
 Dan Higgins – baritone saxophone, tenor saxophone
 Sean Hurley – bass guitar
 John Hanes – engineer
 Serban Ghenea – engineer, mixer
 Jerry Hey – horn arranger 
 Chris Gehringer – mastering
 Bill Reichenbach Jr. – trombone
 Wayne Bergeron – trumpet

Charts

Weekly charts

Year-end charts

Release history

References

2021 singles
2021 songs
Interscope Records singles
Benny Blanco songs
Marshmello songs
Vance Joy songs
Songs written by Benny Blanco
Songs written by Marshmello
Songs written by Vance Joy
Song recordings produced by Benny Blanco
Songs written by Caroline Pennell